Chokhatauri is a town in Georgia’s Guria region, 310 km west to the nation's capital of Tbilisi. It is an administrative center of Chokhatauri Municipality, which comprises the town itself and its adjoining 61 villages. The area of the town is 204 km2; population – 1815 (2014).

Several historical monuments are scattered across the district, e.g. an early medieval fortress of Bukistsikhe, and a monastic complex of Udabno.

Near the town is a health resort based on the natural mineral water Nabeglavi, which is similar to Borjomi in its chemical composition. Bakhmaro is another nearby mountain resort that is famous for its unique wooden cottages on stilts in the mist of the mountains. Nabeglavi mineral water and Bakhmaro spring water are bottled by Healthy Water Ltd. in Chokhatauri.

References

External links

References

Cities and towns in Guria